was a Japanese samurai of the Sengoku period, who served the Uesugi clan of Echigo Province. He was one of the most important and well known generals of Uesugi Kenshin.

He earned a reputation for being extremely ferocious warrior like Kato Kiyomasa, etc. He fought at the 3rd battle of the Battles of Kawanakajima against the Takeda clan and led the vanguard force for the Uesugi at the 4th battle. Kenshin suspected Kageie of treason and ordered his death, by seppuku. A smoldering revenge that he would harbor for the rest of his life.

References

Further reading
Murooka, Hiroshi (1969). Kakizaki Kageie. Tokyo: Tokyo Nihon Jōkaku shiryōkan.

Samurai
1575 deaths
Uesugi retainers
Year of birth uncertain